The Alpha Jax is an electric subcompact crossover quad coupe to be produced by American electric vehicle company Alpha Motor Corporation in 2023. It is based on the Alpha Ace coupe.

Overview
The Alpha Jax was revealed as a 3D rendering online in February 2021, planned to be launched by the end of 2023. With "Jax" being an acronym of "Junior All-terrain Crossover", the car is essentially the Ace coupe but with two extra half-doors in the rear for easier rear access (quad coupe), a higher suspension, and off-roading tires and accessories.

In November 2021, Alpha Motor Corporation introduced the Adventure Series, a special edition line available for both the Jax and Ace, in partnership with KC HiLiTES and KMC Wheels. The Adventure Series package adds new off-road lights, tires, and wheels.

Specifications

References

Crossover sport utility vehicles
Upcoming car models